The Exclusive Economic Zone of Cyprus is a claimed area by Cyprus that covers 98,707 square km (38,100 square miles) and is divided into 13 exploration squares. Cyprus' EEZ borders those of Greece, Turkey, Syria, Lebanon, Israel and Egypt. The process of creating exclusive economic zones of Cyprus, Israel and Lebanon took place in Nicosia in 2010 with separate meetings between each country. Cyprus and Israel, as part of their broader cooperation, have agreed to start gas exploration with a joint US company, namely Noble Energy. The Cypriot and Israeli governments are discussing exporting their natural gas through the transport of compressed natural gas to Greece and then to the rest of Europe or through submarine pipelines starting from Israel and then leading to Greece via Cyprus.

See also 
Geography of Cyprus
Exclusive economic zone of Greece

References 

Law of the sea
Borders of Cyprus
Economy of Cyprus